Gibberula subbulbosa, common name the toothed margin shell, is a species of sea snail, a marine gastropod mollusk, in the family Cystiscidae.

Distribution
This marine species is endemic to Australia and occurs off New South Wales, Queensland, South Australia, Tasmania, Victoria, and Western Australia

References

 Tate, R. 1878. The Recent Marginellidae of South Australia. Transactions of the Philosophical Society of Adelaide 1877-78: 85-89 
 Petterd, W. 1884. Description of new Tasmanian shells. Journal of Conchology 4: 135-145
 Cotton, B.C. 1944. Australian margin shells: Marginellidae. South Australian Naturalist 22(4): 9-16 
 Laseron, C. 1957. A new classification of the Australian Marginellidae (Mollusca), with a review of species from the Solanderian and Dampierian Zoogeographical Provinces. Australian Journal of Marine and Freshwater Research 8(3): 274–311, figs 1-84 
 Wagner, R.J.L & Abbott, R.T. 1977. Standard Catalog of Shells. Greenville, Delaware : American Malacologists 3rd. 
 Lipe, R. 1991. Marginellas. Florida : The Shell Store Vol. 1.
 Hewish, D.R. & Gowlett-Holmes, K.L. 1991. Mollusc type specimens in the South Australian Museum. 4. Gastropoda: Marginellidae. Records of the South Australian Museum (Adelaide) 25(1): 57-70
 Wilson, B. 1994. Australian marine shells. Prosobranch gastropods. Kallaroo, WA : Odyssey Publishing Vol. 2 370 pp.

External links
 Beechey, D. 2004. Gibberula subbulbosa (Tate, 1878)

subbulbosa
Gastropods described in 1878
Gastropods of Australia
Cystiscidae